The Republic of Macedonia competed at the 2008 Summer Olympics in Beijing, China.

Athletics

Key
 Note – Ranks given for track events are within the athlete's heat only
 Q = Qualified for the next round
 q = Qualified for the next round as a fastest loser or, in field events, by position without achieving the qualifying target
 NR = National record
 N/A = Round not applicable for the event
 Bye = Athlete not required to compete in round

Men

Women

Canoeing

Slalom

Shooting 

Men

Swimming

Men

Women

Qualifiers for the latter rounds of swimming events were decided on a time only basis, therefore positions shown are overall results versus competitors in all heats.

Wrestling 

Key
  - Victory by Fall.
  - Decision by Points - the loser with technical points.
  - Decision by Points - the loser without technical points.

Men's freestyle

See also
 Macedonia at the 2008 Summer Paralympics

References

Nations at the 2008 Summer Olympics
2008
Summer Olympics